A Security Alert Team (also known as a Security Reaction Team or SRT) is a party of crew members aboard a United States Navy ship detailed to respond in the event of a security breach or threatened attack in port. 

These team members are authorized deadly force to negate security threat.

A SAT is typically led by a gunner's mate under the authority of the Weapons officer, and is armed with the M9 or M1911A1 pistol, and 12-ga. shotguns (usually the Mossberg M500/590). Members are most often drawn from Weapons Department personnel who receive extensive firearm training and drills, and are often used on the watch rotation in-port and when moored, as Armed Brow Watches, and anchor chain watch in the foc'sle (i.e. not in port, but moored). They often act and train in tandem with the MARDET, the ships Marine Detachment, if the ship has one. When an alert is sounded (in code that only the team knows), team members scramble to the Ship's Armory to be issued weapons (the M9 or M1911A1 pistol, and 12-ga. shotguns (usually the Mossberg M500/590). They then confront the threat. Response time is critical, so many drills and scenarios are performed to maximize team efficiency. 

In most cases, a SAT is supported by a Backup Alert Force which is a team of crew members aboard US Navy ships detailed to provide overwatch and medium-range firepower in the event of a security breach or threatened attack in port, and to boarding and search parties at sea.  A BAF is also typically led by a gunner's mate under the authority of the Weapons officer, and is armed with the M14 semi-automatic rifle in 7.62×51mm NATO caliber.  The main purpose of these two teams is to cover the special weapons holds.  They can only be told to stand down by the captain, executive officer, weapons officer, or the duty officer if the first three are not present. That person must be escorted and have military ID for confirmation of the person to secure the detail.  This detail can also be led by a bosun's mate.  Any unauthorized personnel who do not comply with the team's orders and continue to approach the secured area will cause the team to implement a security lockdown procedure. The approaching person will be placed on the ground at gunpoint until their security clearance is verified.

Naval warfare tactics
United States Navy sailors